William Milton Harris (February 10, 1965 – February 4, 2014) was a tight end in the National Football League.

Biography
Harris was born on February 10, 1965, in Houston, Texas.
He died in Houston, Texas, on February 4, 2014 after a long bout with Lou Gehrig's disease. He was interred at Resthaven Cemetery, Houston, Texas.

Career
Harris was drafted by the Arizona Cardinals in the seventh round of the 1987 NFL Draft and spent that season with the team. After a year away from the NFL, Harris spent the 1989 NFL season with the Tampa Bay Buccaneers and the 1990 NFL season with the Green Bay Packers.

He played at the collegiate level at Bishop College and the University of Texas at Austin.

See also
List of Green Bay Packers players

References

Players of American football from Houston
St. Louis Cardinals (football) players
Tampa Bay Buccaneers players
Green Bay Packers players
American football tight ends
Bishop Tigers football players
Texas Longhorns football players
1965 births
2014 deaths
National Football League replacement players